Hemigraphis is a genus of plants in the family Acanthaceae, consisting of nearly 40 species native to tropical Asia. Hemigraphis is similar to plants the genus Strobilanthes, with some species now placed there. Its native range is Nansei-shoto and from Indo-China to New Guinea.

Species
Plants of the World Online currently includes:

 Hemigraphis angustifolia Hallier f.
 Hemigraphis banggaiensis Bremek.
 Hemigraphis betonicifolia Bremek.
 Hemigraphis bicolor (Blume) Boerl.
 Hemigraphis blumeana K.Schum.
 Hemigraphis borneensis Hallier f. ex Koord.
 Hemigraphis buruensis Hallier f.
 Hemigraphis caudigera S.Moore
 Hemigraphis dorensis S.Moore
 Hemigraphis flaccida (Kurz) C.B.Clarke
 Hemigraphis hispidula Craib
 Hemigraphis humilis Bremek.
 Hemigraphis javanica Bremek.
 Hemigraphis kjellbergii Bremek.
 Hemigraphis lasiophylla Bremek.
 Hemigraphis ledermannii Bremek.
 Hemigraphis lithophila K.Schum. & Lauterb.
 Hemigraphis mediocris Bremek.
 Hemigraphis modesta Benoist
 Hemigraphis moluccana Bremek.
 Hemigraphis okamotoi Masam.
 Hemigraphis palopensis Bremek.
 Hemigraphis parva Bremek.
 Hemigraphis petola Hallier f.
 Hemigraphis prostrata Hallier f.
 Hemigraphis proteus Bremek.
 Hemigraphis ravaccensis (Nees) Boerl.
 Hemigraphis repens Fern.-Vill. - unplaced name (Philippines)
 Hemigraphis ridleyi C.B.Clarke
 Hemigraphis rumphii Bremek.
 Hemigraphis serpens (Nees) Boerl.
 Hemigraphis sordida K.Schum.
 Hemigraphis stenophylla Hallier f.
 Hemigraphis sumatrensis (Roth) Boerl.
 Hemigraphis trichotoma (Nees) Boerl.
 Hemigraphis turnerifolia Benoist
 Hemigraphis weinlandii K.Schum.
 Hemigraphis wetarensis Bremek.
 Hemigraphis whitei S.Moore

Description
Hemigraphis is characterized by the greyish-green leaves, sometimes tinged with red-purple colouration. It is a prostrate plant with spreading growth and rooting stems.

References

External links

Acanthaceae
Acanthaceae genera
Lamiales of Asia